Alex Saji (born 9 May 2000) is an Indian professional footballer who plays as a defender for Indian Super League club NorthEast United, on loan from Hyderabad.

Club career

Gokulam Kerala
In July 2019 Saji joined I-League club Gokulam Kerala FC on a season-long contract.

He then promoted to the main team which goes to kolkata for 2020–21 I-League season.

Hyderabad
On 15 July 2022, Hyderabad completed the signing of Saji on a three-year deal.

Northeast United

International career
On 2 October 2021, Saji was selected for 2022 AFC U-23 Asian Cup Qualification matches which were scheduled to be played between 23 and 31 October 2021.

Career statistics

Club

Honours
Gokulam Kerala
 I-League: 2020–21, 2021–22

References

Living people
2000 births
People from Wayanad district
Indian footballers
India youth international footballers
Footballers from Kerala
Association football central defenders
I-League 2nd Division players
Gokulam Kerala FC players
I-League players
Kerala Blasters FC Reserves and Academy players